John Fahy may refer to:

John Fahy (footballer) (born 1943), Scottish football player
John Fahy (priest) (1893–1969), Irish priest, republican, agrarian and radical
John Fahy (Archdeacon of Aghadoe) (died 1924)

See also
John Fahey (disambiguation)